The 2020–21 Jacksonville State Gamecocks men's basketball team represented Jacksonville State University in the 2020–21 NCAA Division I men's basketball season. The Gamecocks, led by fifth-year head coach Ray Harper, played home games at the Pete Mathews Coliseum in Jacksonville, Alabama in their 18th and final season as members of the Ohio Valley Conference. JSU returned to the ASUN Conference, which it had left in 2003 to join the OVC, on July 1, 2021.

Previous season
The Gamecocks finished the 2019–20 season 13–19, 8–10 in OVC play to finish in seventh place. They lost in the first round of the OVC tournament to Eastern Illinois.

Roster

Schedule and results 

|-
!colspan=12 style=| Regular season

|-
!colspan=12 style=| OVC tournament
|-

|-

Sources

References

Jacksonville State Gamecocks men's basketball seasons
Jacksonville State Gamecocks
Jacksonville State Gamecocks men's basketball
Jacksonville State Gamecocks men's basketball